Bahasa Pangutaran Siyama, also known as Siyama. (e.g: Daa busung, bang manjari niyama ja na ko/kau boh/ampa kita maghati "Excuse me, can you please speak siyama that we are both able to understand one another) and the word phrase "Niyama" is a Siyama transitive verb while the word "Pangutaran" is a noun and the name after "Shariff Pangutaran" the first Filipino people who discover and inhabited the island together with the family members (Belong to Salip Descendants), but before the island called PANGUTARAN what we know today, it's also been called "Pulau Bangkuruan" by Malay speakers means The island with the Bankudo tree(s) (Morinda citrifolia). Pangutaran Siyama is the language of the Siyama people (Siyama Al-Pangutaran or Siyamal) of the Sulu Archipelago. It is not quite intelligible with other varieties of Samal-Bajau.

References

Sama–Bajaw languages
Languages of Sulu